Love/Hate is an Irish dramatic television series broadcast on RTÉ Television. The show aired between 2010 and 2014 on RTÉ One and RTÉ Player. The show depicts fictional characters in Dublin's criminal underworld.

The show is mostly filmed in Dublin, with some scenes shot in bordering counties. Since its release, it has grown in popularity with series 3 attracting close to one million viewers on several occasions.

In November 2014, RTÉ stated that a sixth series would be made, but the show would be taking a year-long break in 2015. However, in November 2015, RTÉ stated that there were no longer plans to make a sixth series. In 2017, actor John Connors confirmed that production of Love/Hate had ceased and there would be no more seasons aired.

Description
The story is set in Dublin's criminal underworld. The first season introduced John Boy, criminal kingpin, and the four friends Darren, Nidge, Robbie and Tommy as members of his gang. The show has also featured Ruth Negga, Ruth Bradley, Killian Scott, and Chris Newman. The story focused on rivalries within the criminal milieu and the psychological effects of violence on the Darren character. It is directed by David Caffrey and produced by Simon Massey, Suzanne McAuley, and James Flynn. The first series began broadcasting on 3 October 2010 at 21:30. It was repeated on Thursday nights at 23:10 on RTÉ One and placed on the RTÉ Player for three weeks after broadcast. The second series began broadcasting on 6 November 2011 at 21:30.

The fourth season began broadcasting on 6 October 2013. The opening episode of season four attracted 970,600 viewers on RTÉ One.

Each episode cost approximately €600,000 to make.

Cast
 Tom Vaughan-Lawlor as Nigel "Nidge" Delaney
 Killian Scott as Thomas "Tommy" Daly
 Aoibhinn McGinnity as Patricia "Trish" Delaney
 Charlie Murphy as Siobhán Delaney

Introduced in season 1
 Robert Sheehan as Darren Treacy (Series 1–3)
 Chris Newman as Robbie Treacy
 Ruth Bradley as Mary Treacy (Series 1–2)
 Aidan Gillen as "John Boy" Power (Series 1–2)
 Brian Gleeson as Hughie "Cueball" Power
 Ruth Negga as Rosie Moynihan (Series 1–2)
 Peter Campion as Stephen "Stumpy" Doyle (Series 1–2)
 Laurence Kinlan as Eric "Elmo" Creed (Series 1, Series 3–5)

Introduced in season 2
 Peter Coonan as Francis "Fran" Cooney (Series 2–5)
 Mark Dunne as Adrian "Ado" Kenny (Series 2–5)
 Susan Loughnane as Debbie (Series 2–4)
 Ian Lloyd Anderson as Dean (Series 2–5)
 Gavin Drea as Luke
 Denise McCormack as Linda Cooney

Introduced in season 3
 Jimmy Smallhorne as Christopher "Git" Loughman
 Jason Barry as Daniel "Dano" Loughman (Series 3–4)
 Seán McGinley as Tony (Series 3–4)
 Eve Macklin as Georgina Loughman
 Patrick Murray as Paddy
 Jim Murray as Ray
 Caoilfhionn Dunne as Lizzie (Series 3–5)
 Siobhan Shanahan as Donna (Series 3–5)
 Stephen Cromwell as Gary Creed
 Mary Murray as Janet Hartigan (Series 3–5)
 Lynn Rafferty as Nadine (Series 3–5)
 Stephen O'Brien as Terry (Series 3–5)

Introduced in season 4
 John Connors as Patrick Ward (Series 4–5)
 Leroy Harris as Glen "Ginny" O'Donoghue (Series 4–5)
 Brían F. O'Byrne as Mick Moynihan (Series 4–5)
 Kieran O'Reilly as Ciarán Madden (Series 4–5)
 Aaron Heffernan as Gavin (Series 4–5)
 Peter O'Meara as Andrew Reddin
 Barry Keoghan as Wayne

Introduced in season 5
 Paudge Behan as Terrence "Big Balls" May
Johnny Ward as Paulie Lawless

Production
Commissioned by RTÉ Drama, it is produced by Octagon Films. The producers are Simon Massey, Suzanne McAuley, and James Flynn. Shooting for the first series began on 12 October 2009. The show is written by Stuart Carolan and initially directed by David Caffrey. The director of photography is Donal Gilligan and the show was filmed on the RED camera, a digital cinema camera, now the Arri Alexa. The production designer is Stephen Daly and the costume designer is Aisling Wallace Byrne. The show is edited by Dermot Diskin.

The second series began filming in late March 2011 on location in Dublin.

On 12 December 2011, RTÉ.ie reported that a third series was in development. On 17 January 2012 this was confirmed by RTÉ.

On 18 December 2012, Irish Independent reported that "filming for the fourth series of Love/Hate is expected to get underway early in the New Year". The first episode of the fourth series was broadcast on 6 October 2013. In November 2013, RTÉ released Love/Hate season 4 on DVD.

In September 2014, series 5 began airing on RTE1. it received high acclaim for its grittier storyline, something that some fans believed had been missing from the fourth series. The series finale was watched by over 1 million viewers and got rave reviews for ending it on a shocking cliffhanger, which included the killing of fan favourite Nidge. The show was officially cancelled in 2017 when John Connors confirmed there would be no more episodes produced, despite early reports that the show would return for a sixth series following a year long hiatus. The fifth series was released on DVD the day after the finale episode aired.

Broadcasts

International broadcasts
The complete series is available to view in Ireland on the RTÉ Player. In the United Kingdom, seasons one and two aired on Scotland's ITV franchise, STV.

RTÉ International and the programme's producers signed an international broadcasting deal with ITV Studios Global Entertainment. ITV Global will help market and distribute the show internationally.

The series is expected to air on television in the US, with a broadcast date yet to be confirmed. Series 1–3 are now available to view via U.S. Netflix, which were added on 18 September 2013.

Also in the United Kingdom season 1 and 2 have been purchased by Channel 5, giving the series a UK-wide broadcast. The first season aired on 24 July 2013. Series 2 was shown on UK freeview channel Spike, following a repeat run of the first series.
The complete series is available on the subscription service BritBox.

In October 2013, it was announced that streaming company Netflix has bought the show and will make it available to its subscribers. The first three series have also been bought by TV markets in Brazil, Israel and Singapore joining Australia, New Zealand and South Korea.

DVD releases

Episodes

Reception
Love/Hate has been well received, and has won eight Irish Film & Television Awards (IFTA), seven of them in 2012. The second series was met with critical acclaim.

On the eve of the third season, The Irish Times hailed the show as "the best drama RTÉ has produced."

The Guardian (UK) praised the show, comparing it to The Wire and The Sopranos, saying "what makes Love/Hate distinctive is the way in which the scripts ... [root] the mobster genre in the trends and tensions of contemporary Irish culture."

Controversy
The programme has attracted criticism for its graphic and explicit portrayals of rape and its effects.

An actor playing an undercover Garda (Kieran O'Reilly) was revealed to be a real member of the Garda National Drug Unit, leading to an internal Garda investigation. Gardaí are not prohibited from acting by the Garda Code. However, there was an inquiry into his appearance on the show.

Viewership ratings

The second series of Love/Hate was the most watched TV show in Ireland in 2011.

970,600 viewers tuned in to watch the series four opener on 6 October 2013. while the Season finale on 10 November 2013 attracted over one million viewers.

The fifth series opened with over 976,400 viewers tuning in on 5 October 2014.

Awards and nominations

Each series of Love/Hate has been successful in garnering recognition and awards. The first series received the most nominations at the 8th Irish Film & Television Awards (IFTAs) in 2011, with Stuart Carolan winning Best Writer (Television). The series also won "Best TV Show" in the Listeners' End of Year Poll on The Ian Dempsey Breakfast Show in 2011.

The second series received as many nominations at the 9th IFTAs the following year. It won seven awards including Best Drama, Best Director (David Caffrey), and Best Writer (Stuart Carolan). Other major awards went to Aidan Gillen (Actor in a Lead Role – Television), Tom Vaughan-Lawlor (Actor in a Supporting Role – Television), and Denise McCormack (Actress in a Supporting Role – Television).

It was once again a big winner at the 10th IFTAs in 2013 when the third series was nominated for eleven categories. It took home six awards including Best Drama, Best Director (David Caffrey), and Best Writer (Stuart Carolan). Tom Vaughan-Lawlor won his second successive acting award for his portrayal of gang leader Nigel "Nidge" Delaney. Charlie Murphy and Susan Loughnane won Best Actress (Television) and Best Supporting Actress (Television), respectively.

The fourth series received eight nominations at the 11th IFTAs in 2014, meaning that the franchise had garnered the most nominations at the awards ceremony for the fourth consecutive year. It won awards for Best Writer (Stuart Carolan) and Actor in a Supporting Role Television (Peter Coonan).

The fifth series was nominated for seven awards at the 12th IFTAs in 2015. It won Best Drama for the third time and Stuart Carolan took home Best Writer for the fifth consecutive year. Charlie Murphy won her second award for Best Actress in a Leading Role (Television Drama) for her portrayal of Siobhán Delaney.

IFTA Film & Drama Awards

References

External links
 Love/Hate at RTÉ.ie
 
 

2010 Irish television series debuts
Irish drama television series
RTÉ original programming
Irish crime television series
Works about organised crime in Ireland
Television series about organized crime
2014 Irish television series endings